Gypodes is a genus of moths of the family Crambidae. It contains only one species, Gypodes vexilliferalis, which is found in Brazil (Pará).

References

Spilomelinae
Taxa named by Eugene G. Munroe
Crambidae genera
Monotypic moth genera